"Israel's Son" is a song by Australian rock band Silverchair, released in 1995. It was the third single released from their debut full-length album, Frogstomp, which was released earlier the same year. It was also released on their The Best of Volume 1.

Origin
Daniel Johns said about the song in an interview with Request Magazine in November 1995:
That [song] was about an execution I saw on tele. I got this video of an execution, and I just saw it, and I was watching it one night, and I had a dream about it, and I woke up and thought, 'Oh yeah, that's pretty cool', and I wrote a song about it.

Murder trial

In a January 1996 murder case, the defendant counsel for Brian Bassett, 16, and Nicholaus McDonald, 18, of McCleary, Washington, claimed that the pair listened to "Israel's Son", from Frogstomp, which contributed to the murders of Bassett's parents and a younger brother on August 10, 1995. McDonald's lawyer cited the lyrics "'Hate is what I feel for you/I want you to know that I want you dead'" which were "almost a script. They're relevant to everything that happened".

The band's manager, John Watson, was quoted as stating on behalf of Silverchair:
"Silverchair do not, have not, and never would condone violence of any sort. The band is appalled by this horrific crime and they hope that justice will prevail in prosecuting whoever is responsible for it. The band extends its sincere sympathies to the families and friends of the victims in this case. Silverchair absolutely rejects any allegation that their song is in any way responsible for the actions of the alleged murders. It is a matter of public record that the song in question, Israel's Son, was inspired by a television documentary about wartime atrocities. Israel's Son was never intended to provoke violence and cannot be interpreted by any reasonable person as doing so. In fact, the song seeks to criticise violence and war by portraying them in all their horror."

Prosecutors rejected the defence case and convinced the jury that the murder was committed to "steal money and belongings and run off to California."

Charts

Certifications

References

External links
Silverchair FAQs on silverchair.nu

1995 singles
Silverchair songs
Songs written by Daniel Johns
Song recordings produced by Kevin Shirley
Black-and-white music videos
1995 controversies
Music controversies
20th-century controversies in the United States
1995 songs
Murmur (record label) singles